The Dampfbahn Fränkische Schweiz e. V. (Franconian Switzerland Steam Railway Co. Ltd.) or DFS is a German museum railway operated by a registered society (eingetragener Verein) in Ebermannstadt, in a region of northern Bavaria, Germany, known as Franconian Switzerland.

Goals 

The society's goals are the:
 establishment, operation, and preservation of a museum railway on the former federal railway line from Ebermannstadt to Behringersmühle in the Wiesent Valley;
 acquisition and preservation of historic railway vehicles, especially those traditionally associated with the Ebermannstadt–Behringersmühle branch line;
 organisation of presentations, tours, trips, and exhibitions.

Operations 
Since 1980, the society has had a permit to operate a railway and is an authorised railway service and railway infrastructure operator. The Franconian Switzerland Steam Railway is the oldest museum railway in Franconia, northern Bavaria.

Between 1 May and 31 October, the museum railway runs scheduled trains on Sundays. For the operation of the museum, the DFS has a fleet comprising three steam locomotives, an accumulator railcar, four diesel locomotives, and a diesel railbus as well as a number of historic passenger coaches.

See also 
 Royal Bavarian State Railways
 Deutsche Reichsbahn
 Deutsche Bundesbahn
 List of Bavarian locomotives and railbuses
 List of DRG locomotives and railbuses

References

Literature 
 Die Museumsbahn Ebermannstadt-Behringersmühle. Hans Falkenberg Verlag, Haßfurt. .

External links 
 Official Homepage of the Franconian Switzerland Steam Railway Society

Railway museums in Germany
Heritage railways in Germany
Railway museums in Bavaria
Franconian Switzerland
Standard gauge railways in Germany
Ebermannstadt